New Jersey's 3rd legislative district is one of 40 in the state. As of the 2011 apportionment the district covers the Cumberland County municipalities of Bridgeton, Deerfield Township and Upper Deerfield Township; the Gloucester County municipalities of Clayton, East Greenwich Township, Elk Township, Franklin Township, Glassboro, Greenwich Township, Logan Township, National Park, Newfield, Paulsboro, South Harrison Township, Swedesboro, West Deptford Township, Woodbury Heights and Woolwich Township; and all Salem County municipalities, including Alloway Township, Carneys Point Township, Elmer, Elsinboro Township, Lower Alloways Creek Township, Mannington Township, Oldmans Township, Penns Grove, Pennsville Township, Pilesgrove Township, Pittsgrove Township, Quinton Township, Salem, Upper Pittsgrove Township and Woodstown.

Demographic characteristics
As of the 2020 United States census, the district had a population of 233,238, of whom 180,926 (77.6%) were of voting age. The racial makeup of the district was 155,956 (66.9%) White, 33,610 (14.4%) African American, 1,819 (0.8%) Native American, 4,611 (2.0%) Asian, 57 (0.0%) Pacific Islander, 19,499 (8.4%) from some other race, and 17,686 (7.6%) from two or more races. Hispanic or Latino of any race were 34,897 (15.0%) of the population.

The district had 159,457 registered voters as of December 1, 2021, of whom 58,474 (36.7%) were registered as unaffiliated, 57,390 (36.0%) were registered as Democrats, 41,186 (25.8%) were registered as Republicans, and 2,407 (1.5%) were registered to other parties.

Political representation
For the 2022–2023 session, the district is represented in the State Senate by Edward Durr (R, Logan Township) and in the General Assembly by Bethanne McCarthy-Patrick (R, Mannington Township) and Beth Sawyer (R, Woolwich Township).

The legislative district overlaps with New Jersey's 1st and 2nd congressional districts.

1965–1973
The 1964 Supreme Court decision in Reynolds v. Sims required legislative districts' populations be equal as possible. As an interim measure, the 3rd District in the 1965 State Senate election encompassed all of Camden County and elected two members to the Senate. In this case, Republican Frederick Scholz and Democrat A. Donald Bigley were sent to Trenton for a two-year term beginning in 1966.

For the next three elections, the 3rd District became made up of all of Camden, Gloucester, and Salem counties and was further divided into four Assembly districts (Districts 3A, 3B, 3C, and 3D). In the 1967 and 1971 Senate elections, a total of four Senators were elected from the district but candidates were nominated by Assembly district and were elected by only the residents of the respective district. Each Assembly district elected two members in each election.

The members elected to the Senate from each district are as follows:

The members elected to the Assembly from each district are as follows:

District composition since 1973
Starting in 1973 with the creation of 40 equal-population districts statewide, the 3rd District was made up of all of Salem County and most of Gloucester County. Some southeastern Gloucester County municipalities were removed from the District in the 1981 redistricting but several sparsely-populated Cumberland County townships along the Delaware Bay were added. The Cumberland County city of Bridgeton and some adjacent townships were added in the 1991 redistricting but the boroughs of Pitman and Glassboro were moved out. The only changes made during the 2001 redistricting were the removal of Woodbury and the addition of Elk Township and Clayton borough.

The 2011 apportionment added Franklin Township (from 4th District), Glassboro (4th), Newfield (4th) and Woodbury Heights (5th). Municipalities that had been in the 3rd District as part of the 2001 apportionment that were shifted out of the district are Commercial Township, Downe Township, Fairfield Township, Greenwich Township, Hopewell Township, Lawrence Township, Shiloh and Stow Creek Township (all to the 1st District); and Harrison Township, Mantua Township and Wenonah (all to the 5th District).

Election history

Election results, 1973–present

Senate

General Assembly

Election results, 1965–1973

Senate

District 3 At-large

District 3A

District 3B

District 3C

District 3D

General Assembly

District 3A

District 3B

District 3C

District 3D

References

Cumberland County, New Jersey
Gloucester County, New Jersey
Salem County, New Jersey
03